Ideal Home is a 2018 American comedy-drama film, written and directed by Andrew Fleming and starring Steve Coogan, Paul Rudd, Alison Pill, Jake McDorman, and Jack Gore.

It premiered at the Mardi Gras Film Festival on February 15, 2018 and was released in the United States on June 29, 2018.

Plot

Erasmus and Paul are a couple whose life is turned inside out when a ten-year-old boy, Bill, shows up at their door claiming to be Erasmus's grandson. Erasmus is a famous chef and Paul is the producer of his cooking show, and they live in a large showplace house in New Mexico. 

Bill's father, Beau, was the result of a one-time heterosexual encounter, and Erasmus has never met him or Bill. Beau has been jailed on drug charges and instructed Bill to find his grandfather.

Erasmus and Paul come to embrace parenthood, although Paul does most of the heavy lifting. Beau attempts to get clean in jail, and tells Erasmus and Paul that he plans to take Bill out of state once he is released. 

When Bill says he would rather stay with the couple, Erasmus consults a lawyer. He is told that it's unlikely he'll get custody unless Bill is in immediate danger from his father. 

Erasmus and Paul try to enjoy the holidays with Bill and the time they have left with him. After Beau shows up to take Bill, Erasmus invites him in hoping to change his mind; later that night, Beau takes Bill and leaves without saying goodbye.

Erasmus and Paul's relationship has been strained, and Paul tells Erasmus that he plans to take a job with Rachael Ray's show in New York. Erasmus seems indifferent at first but jumps in front of Paul's car and begs him to stay. Paul goes as far as the airport, but turns back and they reconcile. 

Beau gets into a drunk-driving accident with Bill in the car, and Erasmus and Paul are awarded custody.

Cast
 Steve Coogan as Erasmus Brumble, Beau's father, Bill's grandfather and a TV chef
 Paul Rudd as Paul Morgan, Erasmus's director and long-term partner
 Jack Gore as Angel/Bill Brumble, Erasmus's estranged grandson
 Alison Pill as Melissa from Child Protective Services
 Jake McDorman as Beau Brumble, Bill's father and Erasmus’ son
 Jesse Luken as Director
 Eric Womack as Officer Forrest
 Jordyn Aquino as Leticia
 Jenny Gabrielle as Betty
 Lora Martinez-Cunningham Ms. Garcia
 Monique Candelaria as Officer Guttierez
 Frances Lee McCain as Doris
 Marie Wagenman as Little Girl at Indian Party

Production
Andrew Fleming directed the film from his own script. The film was produced by Aaron Ryder, Gabrielle Tana, Maria Teresa Arida, Clark Peterson, and Maxime Rémillard.

Principal photography on the film began on May 11, 2016 in Santa Fe, New Mexico.

Release
In May 2016, Remstar Films acquired the Canadian distribution rights to the film. The film had its world premiere at the Mardi Gras Film Festival on February 15, 2018. Shortly after, Brainstorm Media acquired U.S. distribution rights to the film and set it for June 29, 2018.

Reception
The critical consensus reads: "Ideal Home benefits from the chemistry between a well-chosen cast, whose work helps tip the scales against the script's inconsistent -- and occasionally retrograde -- humor." On Metacritic, the film has a weighted average rating of 62 out of 100, based on 10 critics, indicating "generally favorable reviews". Zac Platt of ScreenRealm gave the film 3/5 stars, writing that "even if it's not a must see, the warm and fuzzy tone and winning characters make Ideal Home an easy recommendation."

References

External links
 

2018 films
2018 comedy-drama films
2018 LGBT-related films
American comedy-drama films
American LGBT-related films
Films directed by Andrew Fleming
Films scored by John Swihart
Films shot in New Mexico
Gay-related films
LGBT-related comedy-drama films
Films about parenting
2010s English-language films
2010s American films
English-language comedy-drama films